Pipestem Dam is an embankment dam located in Stutsman County, North Dakota, U.S. The dam was constructed by the U.S. Army Corps of Engineers for flood damage reduction, fish and wildlife enhancement, and recreation. The dam impounds the Pipestem River to create the Pipestem Reservoir, also known as Pipestem Lake. Construction of the dam began in June 1971, and was completed in 1973. The dam measures approximately 4,000 feet in length, with a maximum height of 107.5 feet from the stream bed to the top of the dam. The dam and reservoir are managed by the U.S. Army Corps of Engineers, with fish and wildlife resources managed by the North Dakota Game and Fish Department.

See also
Jamestown Dam
List of dams and reservoirs in North Dakota
List of dams in the Missouri River watershed

External links
U.S. Army Corps of Engineers, Omaha District
North Dakota Game and Fish Department
Map of Pipestem Reservoir - ND Game and Fish Department
Pipestem Reservoir - Discover Jamestown, ND

References

Dams in North Dakota
Embankment dams
Buildings and structures in Stutsman County, North Dakota
United States Army Corps of Engineers dams
Dams completed in 1973